Charles Emanuel Shulman (July 25, 1900 – June 2, 1968) was a Russian-American rabbi and attorney.

Biography 
Shulman was born in Berdichev, Ukraine, (then the Russian Empire), on July 25, 1900 (although his official Russian birth certificate, presented to the family following his death, recorded his birth date as July 3, 1898), one of six children of Rachel  Nemerov  Shulman, who brought her six children to the United States in 1904, around the time his father Maurice (Elimelech) died, and  settled in Cleveland, Ohio.

Shulman studied at Ohio Northern University -1920 and received a Bachelor of Law degree in 1920. and was admitted to the Ohio state ba. He attended  the University of Cincinnati 1922-23. From 1923-24, he studied at the University of Chicago where he received his  Ph.B (Bachelor of Philosophy). He received his M.A. in Comparative Religion from the same university in 1930.

Shulman worked as a lawyer for railroad companies in the early 1920s. He was a rabbi in Johnstown, Pennsylvania (1926–27) and at Congregation Leshem Shomayim in Wheeling, West Virginia (1927–31). From 1931 until 1946, he was the rabbi of the North Shore Congregation 
Israel, Glencoe, Illinois, which he left to  become the founding rabbi of Riverdale Temple, The Liberal Synagogue, in the Riverdale section of the Bronx,  where he presided  from 1947 until his death in 1968.

World War II
Shulman  enlisted in the U.S. Navy in 1943 and served as chaplain at Newport, Quonset and Camp Endicott in Rhode Island. He was the sole Jewish Naval chaplain in New England at that time.

From November, 1944 to October, 1945, he served as the first  Jewish chaplain and the only rabbi among 225 chaplains in the Seventh Fleet in the South Pacific Theater of Operations, commanded by Admiral Thomas C. Kinkaid.

In 1945, he received the Navy Commendation Award for outstanding service overseas .  He completed his naval service in January, 1946. He was awarded the Service  Recognition  Certificate Citation for Meritorious Service by the State of Illinois in 1947. He was honorably discharged from the Navy on Jan. 25, 1951.

Positions and honors

  Recipient George Washington Medal Freedom Foundation, 1953,1954,1955, 1961 and 1963 for outstanding sermons. 
  Honorary Doctorate, Ohio Northern University,   (1954);
  Honorary Doctorate, Hebrew Union College  Jewish Institute of Religion, 1956;  
  Honorary Doctorate, Boston University (1959)

Works

Books 
 Problems of Jews in the Contemporary World (1934)
 Europe's Conscience in Decline (1939)
 What It Means to Be a Jew (1960)

Other publications 
Religion's Message in a War- Torn World (1942)  
The Test  of a Civilization (1947)
On Being a Jew (1954)  
A People that Did Not Die, (1956) 
The Best Years of Our Lives (1958) 
Humanity's Unfinished Business (1964)

He also wrote pamphlets of commentary on the liturgy and on traditional chants, among them “On the Sabbath,” “On the Holydays” and a “Book of Remembrance ” for the Yom Kippur memorial services.

His papers and diaries are held by the Jacob Radar Marcus Center of the American Jewish Archives, Hebrew Union College, Cincinnati, Ohio.

Family
He was married to the Jewish educator Avis Clamitz (1908-1991), with whom he had a daughter had a daughter.

References

1900 births
1968 deaths
Place of death missing
Religious leaders from Cleveland
Ohio Northern University alumni
University of Cincinnati alumni
University of Chicago alumni
Hebrew Union College – Jewish Institute of Religion alumni
United States Navy officers
United States Navy personnel of World War II
American people of Russian-Jewish descent
Rabbis from Wheeling, West Virginia